Pemmican Step is a step-like rise in the level of Tucker Glacier above its junction with Leander Glacier, in Victoria Land. It is very crevassed in its southern half, but there is easy traveling over it toward its north end. Named by the New Zealand Geological Survey Antarctic Expedition (NZGSAE), 1957–58. It is the second of the steps on this glacier.

References

Ice slopes of Antarctica
Landforms of Victoria Land
Borchgrevink Coast